Senafe Subregion is a subregion in the Debub (Southern) region (Zoba Debub) of Eritrea. Its capital is Senafe, and high points include Emba Soira.

Overview
Lying on the edge of the Ethiopian Highlands, the district is inhabited by the Tigrinya and the Saho.

Senafe is known for the ruins of Metera (also known as Balaw Kalaw), the monolithic church of Enda-Tsadkan.

References
Awate.com: Martyr Statistics

Southern Region (Eritrea)
Subregions of Eritrea